The 9K52 Luna-M (NATO reporting name FROG-7) is a Soviet short-range artillery rocket system which fires unguided and spin-stabilized 9M21 rockets.  It was originally developed in the 1960s to provide divisional artillery support using tactical nuclear weapons but gradually modified for conventional use.  The 9K52 was eventually succeeded by the OTR-21 Tochka.

Description
Originally called the 3R-11 and 9R11, the 9M21 is a solid fuel rocket with four off-angle vernier chambers immediately behind the warhead section.  When the main engine section ignites, the verniers activate to start spinning the rocket to improve stability and accuracy.  At range, the 9M21 has a nominal CEP (circular error probable) of 400 meters.  Western intelligence estimated that its CEP at maximum range was 500 to 700 meters, but Russian sources admit the likely impact point could fall anywhere within an area 2.8 kilometers in depth from range error and 1.8 kilometers in width in azimuth error.

The initial 3R-11 rocket, known also by its military designation R-65 (NATO: FROG-7A), measured 8,900 mm in length. It was replaced in 1968 with an improved R-70 (NATO: FROG-7B) which measured 9400 mm.

The rocket is mounted on a transporter erector launcher (TEL) designated 9P113.  Based on the ZIL-135LM 8x8 truck, it features a large hydraulic crane to allow faster reloading.  The 9T29 transporter, also based on the ZIL-135RTM chassis, can carry up to three 9M21 rockets.

In addition to its inaccuracy, the fact that the rocket was exposed to the weather was another drawback to the system, particularly when equipped with temperature-sensitive nuclear ordnance.  In the early 1960s the Soviets experimented with a modified 9P113 launch vehicle with a fully-enclosed superstructure and launch roof.  This did not solve the issue entirely though, necessitating the development of the Tochka.

Operation
In Soviet service, the Luna-M was organized into battalions to provided divisions with rocket artillery support.  Each battalion was organized with a headquarters battery and two firing batteries.  Total complement included 20 officers, 160 enlisted personnel, four 9P113 launchers and (on average) seven rockets per launcher. 

The headquarters battery numbered about 80 personnel and provided the battalion with command and logistical support.  Vehicles included 4 9T29 transporter vehicles, a 9T31M1 crane vehicle (Ural-375D), an RM-1 maintenance complex (3 ZIL-157s), an RVD-1 optical maintenance vehicle (Ural-375D) and PKPP maintenance/check vehicle (ZIL-131).

Each firing battery was organized with a headquarters, a meteorological section, a survey section, and two firing sections.  The headquarters included a 9S445M command vehicle: a GAZ-66 truck with attached shelter containing fire control computer, radios and telephones.  The meteorological section operated the RVS-1 Malakhit and a RMS-1 meteorological radar in the 1970s, but later upgraded to a RMS-1 End Tray radar supported by an auxiliary power unit, each towed by a GAZ-66.  The survey section used a GAZ-69TM/TMG/TMG-2, GAZ-66T or UAZ-452T for launch site preparation.  Each firing section consisted of a single 9P113.

Preparing the launcher to fire could take anywhere from 15 to 30 minutes, and launch sites were generally located 20 to 25 kilometers behind the front line.  It was the longest-ranged artillery system available to a division commander and typically reserved for special missions.  Because the rocket's inaccuracy at long range made the use of conventional warheads insufficient barring a large and vital target, the system was more useful deploying specialized warheads.

History
A number of Luna missiles, and 12 compatible 2-kiloton nuclear warheads, were deployed with Soviet forces in Cuba during the missile crisis in October 1962.

The Luna was later extensively deployed throughout some Soviet satellite states. The rocket has been widely exported and is now in the possession of a large number of countries.

Syria 
In what became its first use in combat, Syrian forces fired a FROG-7 barrage at Galilee on 7 October and 8 October 1973, in the course of the Yom Kippur War. Although aimed at Israeli air bases such as Ramat David, the rockets struck several Israeli settlements. These unintended attacks on civilians gave Israel the justification to launch a sustained air campaign inside Syria itself.

Starting in 2012, during the Syrian Civil War, the Syrian Army fired several FROG-7 rockets against different areas under control of different insurgent formations.

Iraq 
Iraq made intensive use of FROG-7 rockets in the war with Iran (1980-88). After the war with Iran, Iraq modified its stock of 9M21s by extending their range to 90 km and fitting a submunition-carrying warhead.  The upgraded rocket was renamed Laith-90. On 21 February 1991, during operation Desert Storm, Senegalese troops were hit hard by a Laith-90. Eight Senegalese soldiers were wounded in action as a result.

During the 2003 invasion of Iraq, the Headquarters of the 2nd Brigade, US 3rd Infantry Division, Tactical Operations Center (TOC) of U.S Col. David Perkins, was targeted and struck by either an Iraqi FROG-7 rocket or an Ababil-100 SSM missile, killing three soldiers and two embedded journalists. Another 14 soldiers were injured, and 22 vehicles destroyed or seriously damaged, most of them Humvees.

Yugoslavia 
In the course of the Yugoslav Wars, Serb forces launched FROG-7 rockets on a number of Croatian forces, like Orašje, Croatian military stronghold, in the outskirts of Zupanja, on 2 December 1992, where several civilians were killed, or the military airport Zagreb, on 11 September 1993, while the battle of Medak Pocket was still going on.

Libya 
RAF jets targeted and destroyed FROG-7 launchers operated by pro-Gaddafi forces south of Sirte in the 2011 Libyan civil war.

Variants
9M21B
Nuclear-armed variant, fitted with one of three warheads.  The original AA-22 has a variable yield of 3, 10 and 20 kilotons.  The AA-38 is an improved version with the same three settings.  The AA-52 has four yields of 5, 10, 20 and 200 kilotons.
9M21E
Cluster munition variant fitted with a 9N18E dispenser warhead carrying shaped charge dual-purpose submunitions.
9M21F
Standard variant fitted with a 9N18F high explosive/fragmentation warhead.
9M21Kh
Chemical weapon variant, the 436kg 9N18kh warhead is fitted with a VT fuze and carries 216kg of VX nerve agent.
Laith-90
Iraqi version with increased range (90 km) and submunition warhead.
PV-65
Training rocket.

Operators

Current operators
  – 24 acquired between 1964 and 1974, 15 systems supposed to be decommissioned by 2014.
 
  – 10
  – some (36 units of 9K52 and Tochka)
  
  – 24 launchers acquired between 1960 and 1969, most likely decommissioned
  – 45
  – units of 9K52 and 2K6 Luna, called Hwasong-3)
  – some in storage
  – 30
  – 50
  – 12

Former operators
 
 
 
 
  – destroyed during the 2003 invasion
  – bought in 1977. Captured by the Iraqi Army during the Gulf War
  – 49 launchers in 1966-2001
 
  – 12 launchers bought from the Soviet Union in 1979
 
 
 Lebanese forces

See also
 T-122 Sakarya
 Fajr-5
 TOROS
 Falaq-2

References

External links

 FAS – Military Analysis Network 
 Profile of the Frog 7  from The Whirlwind War  a publication of the United States Army Center of Military History

Rocket artillery
Unguided nuclear rockets of the Soviet Union
Cold War weapons of the Soviet Union
Chemical weapon delivery systems
Moscow Institute of Thermal Technology products
Military equipment introduced in the 1960s
de:FROG (Rakete)
it:FROG
fi:FROG